Alex Lewis (born 9 January 1978) is an American musician and a former bassist for pop punk band Yellowcard. from March 2003 until March 1, 2004, when he was replaced by Peter Mosely. Lewis appeared in the music videos for "Powder", "Ocean Avenue" and "Way Away".

References

Living people
Jacksonville University alumni
1978 births
21st-century American bass guitarists